Edebessa purens is a moth of the family Megalopygidae. It was described by Francis Walker in 1855. It is found in Brazil.

References

Moths described in 1855
Megalopygidae